Kalimagone is a genus of Malaysian dwarf spiders first described by A. V. Tanasevitch in 2017.  it contains only two species from Borneo.

References

External links

Araneomorphae genera
Linyphiidae